The Count of the Stable was a late Roman and Byzantine office responsible for the horses and pack animals intended for use by the army and the imperial court. From Byzantium, it was adopted by the Franks, and is the origin of the post and title of constable, via the Old French .

History and functions
According to Ammianus Marcellinus, the holders of the post ranked equal to the tribunes of the  guard regiments. , 6.13.1).

Eight holders of the office are known from the 4th century, including Emperor Valens and his brothers-in-law Cerealis and Constantinianus. Evidently, the post was closely associated with the imperial family, as affirmed further when Stilicho was appointed to it on the occasion of his marriage to the adopted niece of Emperor Theodosius I, Serena. However, holders are rarely mentioned thereafter. The distinguished general Flavius Aetius held the post in 451, and in the 6th century, the variant "Count of the Imperial Grooms" was conferred on leading generals such as Belisarius and Constantinianus, while Baduarius, a relative of Emperor Justin II, is recorded by the 9th-century chronicler Theophanes the Confessor to have held the post of 'Count of the Imperial Stables'. The office reappears in the sources in the 820s, when the " and " Damian led an unsuccessful expedition against the Saracens in Crete.

Along with the Logothete of the Herds, he was responsible for the imperial horses in the capital, Constantinople, and for the horse ranches in the great army camp at Malagina in Bithynia.

Aside from bringing the emperor his horse and holding it while he mounted it, the functions of this office are unknown. He does not appear to have held a rank within the court hierarchy, but his proximity to the emperor did apparently lead to some influence, as in the case of Constantine Chadenos, who rose from this post to high political offices under Emperor Michael VIII.

Subordinate officials
The staff of the Count of the Stable is not explicitly mentioned in Byzantine sources, but its composition for the 9th and 10th centuries can be inferred, at least in part, from various sources. It included:

The , in seals often  (according to John Bagnell Bury "an overseer who presses work on"), responsible for fodder, watering, and other related supplies like horseshoes or saddles.
The , the origin of whose title and his functions are unknown. In the sources, he seems to be responsible for outfitting the imperial mules prior to an expedition.
The four counts of Malagina.
Forty grooms, also known as the 'grooms of the two stables' (i.e., Constantinople and Malagina). These were probably subaltern officers charged with leading detachments of mules.

References

Sources

 
 
 
 
 

Byzantine military offices
Byzantine palace offices